Slowdive is the debut EP by the English rock band Slowdive. It was released in 1990 by record label Creation.

Reception 

According to The Rough Guide to Rock, Slowdive was released "to rapturous applause from the press".

In his retrospective review, Andy Kellman of AllMusic wrote "Slowdive's first release is their weakest effort, but it's still a good cluster of somnambulist soundscapes and inert sonic haze. They were definitely falling toward a mood-over-song structure at this point."

Track listing

References

External links 

 

Slowdive albums
1990 debut EPs
Creation Records EPs